The Frantics is a Canadian comedy troupe consisting of Paul Chato, Rick Green, Dan Redican and Peter Wildman.

The group formed in 1979. In 1981, they were given a weekly radio slot on the CBC Radio show Variety Tonight, then hosted by Vicki Gabereau. In the summer of 1982 they were the summer replacement for the Royal Canadian Air Farce. They got their own permanent time slot in the fall of 1983. Between 1981 and 1984, their show, Frantic Times, ran for 113 episodes.  Each episode regularly featured a female "special guest": in the earlier episodes this was Carolyn Scott, while later it was Mag Ruffman. Sound effects formed an important part of the show and were generally provided by Cathy Perry, longtime CBC sound technician and later a producer at CBC.

The album Frantic Times was released in 1984 and collected the best sketches and songs from the radio show. In 2003, Deep Shag Records reissued the album with a new cover and three previously unreleased selections.

In 1984, the troupe was a feature act with a number of sketches in the television pilot, The No Name Show for TVOntario, which was not picked up for a series.  In 1986, the troupe  moved to television, producing a CBC series called Four on the Floor, which lasted only one season of thirteen episodes.

A couple of short radio series followed, including Fran of the Fundy (a three-part spoof of Anne of Green Gables) in 1987, and the eight-part The Frantics Look at History in 1988.

The Frantics were noted for off-the-wall humour, with some skits and novelty songs reminiscent of The Goon Show and Monty Python’s Flying Circus. They satirized everything from suicide hotlines to current ads to Tom Swift science fiction. They were particularly known for the recurring character Mr. Canoehead, a crime fighter with a full-sized aluminum canoe welded to his head by lightning (battle cry: "Taste gunwale!"), and for the catch phrase “Boot to the head!” which is also the title of their most famous sketch.

Some of The Frantics’ radio sketches were also aired in the United States on the Dr. Demento show, as were later Canadian comedy acts such as The Arrogant Worms and The Vestibules.

In 2004 the troupe re-formed, returning to stage with a mix of new and old material, which was released on CD in the form of the Official Bootleg CD: Live at the Tim Sims Playhouse. Following the success of their Older But Wider stage tour in Ontario, The Frantics filmed a comedy special for the Canadian The Comedy Network/CTV in 2005 entitled The Frantics Reunion Special, which aired on January 28, 2006. They also appeared at the 2005 Winnipeg Comedy Festival, which was broadcast on the CBC Festival of Funny radio show. That marked their first ever on-air reunion since 1988. They also appeared in the gala of the festival, which aired on CBC television in March 2006.

Recent engagements include live performances at the Jane Mallett Theatre in Toronto (St. Lawrence Centre for the Arts) featuring a mix of new and revived material. On December 7, 2009, the troupe staged a "one-night only" 30th anniversary performance at which they released their new CD Frantic Noises.

After a fundraiser on Indiegogo ending November 2016, a "Best of Frantic Times" has been set up, mostly excerpting pieces from the CBC radio show, but with occasional pieces of more recent material, publishing what is to be 30 episodes.

Discography
 Frantic Times (1984, re-issued 2003)
 Boot to the Head (1987)
 Official Bootleg CD—Live at the Tim Sims Playhouse (2004)
 Enemies of Reason (2006)
 Frantic Noises (available 2009 with a printed copyright date 2010)

References

External links
The Frantics official website

1979 establishments in Ontario
1981 radio programme debuts
1984 radio programme endings
1984 in Canadian television
Musical groups established in 1979
Musical groups from Toronto
Canadian comedy musical groups
Sketch comedy troupes
Attic Records (Canada) artists
CBC Radio One programs
Canadian comedy troupes
Canadian radio sketch shows
Surreal comedy radio series
Satirical radio programmes
Canadian satirists
Canadian surrealist artists
Surrealist groups